Notable members of the United States Merchant Marine have included:

Jim Bagby Jr. – Major League Baseball pitcher
Raymond Bailey – actor
Alvin Baldus – former Democratic member of Congress
Nathaniel Bowditch – author
L. Brent Bozell Jr. – conservative activist and Catholic writer
Lenny Bruce – comedian and poet 
Gordon Canfield – Republican congressman from New Jersey
Alfonso J. Cervantes – forty-third Mayor of Saint Louis, Missouri
Granville Conway – public servant, Presidential Medal for Merit recipient
Harvey Cox – preeminent theologian and professor at Harvard Divinity School
Joseph Curran – labor leader
Richard Henry Dana Jr. – author
Deborah Doane Dempsey – first American female master to command a cargo ship sailing internationally
Dan Devine – football coach
Peter Falk – actor
Eric Fleming – actor
James Garner – actor
Allen Ginsberg – poet
Seamon Glass – actor and author
Harry Guardino – actor
Woody Guthrie – musician
David Hackworth – retired United States Army colonel and prominent military journalist
Sterling Hayden – actor and author
Chuck Hayward – actor and stuntman
Don Hewitt – television news producer and executive
Chuck Hicks – actor and stuntman
Sadie O. Horton – female mariner who spent World War II working aboard a coastwise U.S. Merchant Marine barge, and posthumously received official veteran’s status for her wartime service in 2017, becoming the first recorded female Merchant Marine veteran of World War II.
Cisco Houston – folk singer
Richard Jaeckel – actor
Cornelius Johnson – Olympic medal-winning high jumper
Irving Johnson – author, adventurer and sail training pioneer
John Paul Jones – naval officer
Jack Kerouac – author
Daniel Keyes – author and professor
Joseph Stanley Kozlowski, AB – portrait and watercolor artist
Leonard LaRue – naval officer who saved 14,000 lives during the Korean War
Jack London – author
Louis L'Amour – author
Jack Lord – actor
Jerry Marcus – cartoonist of comic strip Trudy
Steve McQueen – actor
Herman Melville – author
Ray Montgomery – actor
Hugh Mulzac – master mariner and civil rights activist
James Nachtwey – photojournalist and war photographer
Lloyd Nolan – actor
George H. O'Brien Jr. – Medal of Honor recipient in Korean War 
Jeremiah O'Brien – captain of the privateer Unity in the first battle of the Revolutionary War
Carroll O'Connor – actor
Jack Paar – created TV talk show; was replaced by Johnny Carson
Mary Patten (1837–1861) – only woman to take command of a clipper ship after the captain was incapacitated 
Donn Pearce – author and journalist
Richard Phillips – held hostage by pirates and later rescued
Richard Scott Prather – mystery novelist
Denver Pyle – actor
Bill Raisch – actor, stuntman, dancer and acting coach
Joseph Resnick – Democratic congressman from New York
Nelson Riddle – bandleader, arranger and orchestrator
Cliff Robertson – actor and aviator
Ernie Schroeder – comic book artist
Otto Scott – journalist and author 
Hubert Selby Jr. – author
Frank Sinkwich – 1942 Heisman Trophy winner
Gary Snyder – poet
Joseph D. Stewart – Vice Admiral, Superintendent of the United States Merchant Marine Academy
Montfort Stokes – Democratic Senator 
Oliver Stone – three-time Academy Award-winning film director and screenwriter
Celia Sweet – first female pilot in San Diego Bay, 1912
Paul Teutul Sr. – founder of Orange County Choppers motorcycle manufacturer 
Jim Thorpe – Olympic athlete
Eliza Thorrold – licensed tugboat master, San Francisco Bay, 1897
Mark Twain (born Samuel Clemens) – author; inland waters 
Dave Van Ronk – folk singer nicknamed the "Mayor of MacDougal Street"
Clint Walker – actor
Jack Warden – actor
John S. Watson – New Jersey politician 
Ted Weems – bandleader and musician
Carlia Wescott – first American woman to be granted marine engineer's license, 1922
Haskell Wexler – Academy Award-winning cinematographer, director, producer and screenwriter
Nedd Willard (born 1928) – writer, artist, journalist
Andy Williams – singer
Charles Williams – writer of hardboiled crime fiction
Robin Wilson – science fiction author and editor, and former President of California State University, Chico
Charles Armijo Woodruff – 11th Governor of American Samoa

See also
List of notable mariners

References

 
American
Mariners